Qushkorpi (also Romanized as Qūshkorpī; also known as Qūshkū’ī) is a village in Katul Rural District, in the Central District of Aliabad County, Golestan Province, Iran. At the 2006 census, its population was 448, in 109 families.

References 

Populated places in Aliabad County